Chelyoposuchus is an extinct genus of henodontid placodont found at the Baerecke-Limpricht clay pit, Halberstadt, Germany. The type species, C. crassisquamatus, was named in 1939. It was found in the Knollenmergel Member of the Trossingen Formation, which dates to the late Rhaetian (205.6 - 201.6 Ma) and the holotype was collected by Otto Jaekel between 1909-1913.

References

Placodonts
Prehistoric reptile genera
Fossil taxa described in 1939